Erimayur is a gram panchayat in the Palakkad district, state of Kerala, India. It is a local government organization that serves the villages of Erimayur-I and Erimayur-II.

Demographics
 India census, Erimayur-I is a village in Palakkad district in the state of Kerala. As of 2001 India, Erimayur-II had a population of 14,264 with 7,003 males and 7,261 females.

References 

Gram panchayats in Palakkad district